Gimantis is an Asian genus of praying mantids: in the subfamily Gonypetinae.

Species
The Mantodea Species File lists:
 Gimantis assamica Giglio-Tos, 1915
 Gimantis authaemon Wood-Mason, 1882
 Gimantis insularis Beier, 1937
 Gimantis marmorata Brunner, 1893

References

External links 

Mantodea genera